Born in Lebanon in 1967 in the contemporary theatre world, Zad Moultaka is a composer and visual artist. He started playing the piano at the age of five and moved to Paris in 1984. In 1989, he won the First Prize at the Conservatoire National Superieur de Paris. In 1993, he abandoned his international career as an interpreter to devote himself to composition and visual art. Trained in the discipline of the western musical writing but linked naturally to his Mediterranean roots, Zad Moultaka creates his own musical language. Noticed by György Kurtág, his meeting with the composer was decisive in the statement of a progressive original and atypical writing. His works are interpreted and appreciated throughout the world; he receives the SACEM Prize, Claude Arrieu 2007 and the Critics' Prize, best musical creation in 2017, for his work UM sovereign engine of all things.

His several musical collaborations include 58th Venice Art Biennale, Van Harentz Foundation; Sveriges Radios Symfoniorkester, Stockholm; Deutsche Oper Berlin; Muziktheater Im Revier, Gelsenkirchen; Neue Vocal Solisten, Stuttgart; Choir The elemen. ts; ArsNova set; Ensemble Musicatreize, 2e2m… and more recently, Hémon, Opéra national du Rhin, Strasbourg; Der letzte Klang ist der erste Blick, Ensemble Modern, Frankfurt; Requiem for a New World, Basilica S.S. Giovanni e Paolo, Venice and L’Orangeraie, Compagnie Lyrique de Création Chants Libres, Montreal.

In parallel, he continues his visual arts practice working across installation, painting, photography and video. Recent exhibitions highlights include Totah Gallery New York; Dome Oscar Niemeyer Tripoli-Lebanon; Center Pompidou-Metz; 57th Venice Art Biennale, Sursock Museum, Beirut 2018, Suomennlina, Finland; Nuit Blanche, Paris; Saint-Pierre-aux-Nonnins, Arsenal de Metz and Art Dubai and Palazzo Albrizzi, Venice.

More recently, Moultaka was selected from among 200 Visionaries by Maison Louis Vuitton, in order to create a trunk to mark the 200th birthday of its founder. In November, he will exhibit his new collection “APOCALYPSE 6:08,” at AEDAEN gallery, Strasbourg-France and a visual and sound installation “WAHM” Corridor des Illusions in China.

Discography
Hachô dyôldat Alôhô - La Passion selon Marie (passion in Syriac)
As composer-performer;
Anashid (2001)
Zarani, with soprano Fadia Tomb el-Hage (2003)
Zarani Mouwashahs avec Piano (2004)
Visions with soprano Fadia Tomb el-Hage (2009)
Où en est la nuit 2014
As pianist
 Mirages, Chimères... Musique de Gabriel Fauré, Philippe Balloy baritone with Zad Moultaka piano

Exhibitions

Solo exhibitions
ŠamaŠ (Sun Dark Sun), Pavilion of Lebanon at the Venice Biennale, 2017

Group exhibitions
Cycles Of Collapsing Progress, curated by Karina El Helou and Anissa Touati, Rashid Karami International Fair, Tripoli, Lebanon

References

External links
Official site

Living people
1967 births
Lebanese composers
Lebanese contemporary artists